Chasselas is a commune in the Saône-et-Loire department in the region of Bourgogne-Franche-Comté in eastern France. It has given its name to the white wine grape chasselas.

See also
Communes of the Saône-et-Loire department

References

Communes of Saône-et-Loire